Flower of Devotion is the third studio album by American indie rock band Dehd. The album was released on July 21, 2020, through Fire Talk.

Critical reception

Critical reception to Flower of Devotion was largely favorable, with commentators taking note of the album's more refined production. Scott Russell of Paste noted it "Dehd's best album to date, a significant upgrade on their sound that finds their Windy City DIY scene-honed amalgam of surf rock, shoegaze and dream pop at its most melodic and expressive." Pitchforks Steven Arroyo designated it with the publication's "Best New Music" tag, noting that "the Chicago DIY trio sound newly airy and lush, but no less direct and sincere. Their confidence in their concision is the best part."

Accolades

Year-end lists

Track listing

References

External links 
 Flower of Devotion at Bandcamp

2020 albums
Dehd albums